William Kurtz may refer to:
 William Kurtz (photographer), German-American artist, illustrator, and photographer
 William Kurtz (field hockey), American field hockey player
 William Henry Kurtz, U.S. Representative from Pennsylvania
 William Joseph Kurtz, Polish prelate of the Roman Catholic Church